The Germany national water polo team represents Germany in international men's water polo competitions and friendly matches. It is controlled by German Swimming Federation.

Germany has won several medals in international competitions, including one Olympic gold and one World Cup, as well as 1982 World Championship bronze medal. The team was named Germany's Sportsteam of the Year in 1981.

Results

Olympic Games

World Championship

FINA World Cup

FINA World League

European Championship

As Germany
1926 –  Bronze medal
1927 – 5th place
1931 –  Silver medal
1934 –  Silver medal
1938 –  Silver medal
As West Germany
1954 – 6th place
1958 – 7th place
1966 – 7th place
1970 – 7th place
1974 – 8th place
1977 – 6th place
1981 –  Gold medal
1983 – 5th place
1985 –  Bronze medal
1987 – 4th place
1989 –  Gold medal
As Germany
1991 – 7th place
1993 – 9th place
1995 –  Bronze medal
1997 – 10th place
1999 – 8th place
2001 – 9th place
2003 – 5th place
2006 – 8th place
2008 – 6th place
2010 – 6th place
2012 – 5th place
2014 – 9th place
2016 – 11th place
2018 – 9th place
2020 – 9th place
2022 – 13th place

Current squad
Roster for the 2020 Men's European Water Polo Championship.

Head coach: Hagen Stamm

Notable former coaches
 Nico Firoiu (1975–88, 1993–97)

See also
 East Germany national water polo team
 Germany men's Olympic water polo team records and statistics
 List of Olympic champions in men's water polo
 List of men's Olympic water polo tournament records and statistics

Notes

References

External links

Men's national water polo teams
 
Men's sport in Germany